Buddhist Fat Ho Memorial College is a co-educational secondary school in Hong Kong. The school opened in 1977 and as of 2016 had approximately 350 students. It is run by the Hong Kong Buddhist Association and sponsored by Po Lin Monastery. It is a Direct Subsidy Scheme institution that charges tuition fees. Students can pick between English or Cantonese as their medium of instruction. Situated in Tai O, it is the first co-ed secondary school on Lantau Island. 

Around 2009 the school had annual losses of $5 million HKD with 280 students. In hopes of "reduc[ing] annual losses" the school a Direct Subsidy Scheme (DSS) school. According to Elaine Yau of the South China Morning Post, financial performance improved subsequently during the principalship of Eric Yuon Fuk-lung, thanks in part to significant staffing cuts.

Buddhist Fat Ho Memorial College's motto is "Enlighten with Wisdom, Manifest with Compassion and Pursue kindness and virtue". The school is founded on the Buddhist value that everyone has an equal right to learn.

Student body
Elaine Yau wrote in 2015 that "a number of students come from troubled families or have a chequered past". In 2021 a student was a finalist for South China Morning Post's and the Hong Kong Jockey Club's Hong Kong Student of the Year Award.

Facilities
The Po Lin Monastery has a boarding house with spaces for thirty students.

References

External links

 

Secondary schools in Hong Kong
Buddhist schools in Hong Kong
Hong Kong Buddhist Association schools
Religious organizations established in 1977
Educational institutions established in 1977
Boarding schools in Hong Kong